The 7th Vietnamese Parachute Battalion (Fr: 7e bataillon de parachutistes vietnamiens) was a French-Vietnamese paratroop battalion formed in Hanoi, French Indochina in 1953.

It was part of the First Indochina War.

See also

References

7V
Military units and formations of the First Indochina War
Vietnamese Parachute Battalion
Vietnamese Parachute Battalion
Vietnamese Parachute Regiment
Vietnamese Parachute Battalion
Vietnamese Parachute Battalion